Stenbeck is Swedish language surname. It may refer to:

Cristina Stenbeck (born 1977), American businesswoman
Hugo Stenbeck (1890–1977), Swedish lawyer
Jan Stenbeck (1942–2002), Swedish businessman
Margaretha Stenbeck (born 1939), Swedish politician
Max Stenbeck (1985–2015), American businessman

Fiction
Barbara Stenbeck, fictional character on the television series As the World Turns
James Stenbeck, fictional character on the television series As the World Turns
Lucinda Stenbeck, fictional character on the television series As the World Turns
Paul Stenbeck, fictional character on the television series As the World Turns

See also
Steenbeck (surname)
Steinbach (surname)
Steinbacher
Steinbeck (surname)
Stenbäck

Swedish-language surnames